Federico Curiel (19 February 1917 – 17 June 1985) was a Mexican filmmaker, writer and actor during the Golden Age of Mexican cinema.

Curiel was born in Monterrey, Mexico, he moved to Guadalajara, Jalisco as a child and attended the University of Guadalajara.

Filmography 

 The Curse of Nostradamus (1960)
 The Blood of Nostradamus (1960)
 Los autómatas de la muerte (1962) aka Neutron vs the Death Robots
 Cazadores de cabezas (1962) aka Santo in The Headhunters
 The Mummies of Guanajuato (1972)

References 

1917 births
1985 deaths
Mexican film directors
People from Monterrey